Cedric Solosolo Asuega Gates is a Democratic member of the Hawaii House of Representatives, representing District 44. He was first elected to the chamber in 2016.

Early life and education 
Gates is of African-American and American Samoan descent. His mother, Easter Asuega Gates, died in 2006, and his father, William Gates, died in 2014. According to members of his family, he is the great-grandson of Solosolo Mauga Asuega, who was High Chief of Pago Pago.

Gates attended Waianae High School, and later enrolled at Leeward Community College. In 2013, he was honored by Governor Neil Abercrombie as an Outstanding Advocate for Children and Youth.

Political career
In 2014, Gates ran as a Green Party candidate in District 44, losing to Jo Jordan. In 2016, Gates ran against Jordan, this time in the Democratic primary. Gates' 2016 candidacy was controversial, as his 2014 candidacy as a Green Party candidate was supposed to have barred his nomination as a Democrat under Democratic Party of Hawaii rules.

Nevertheless, Gates defeated incumbent Jo Jordan in the District 44 Democratic primary, and went on to defeat Marc Pa'aluhi in the general election. During the 2016 campaign, his campaign posters were vandalized with a racial slur. Upon taking office at age 23, he became the youngest member of the state legislature. After completing his first term in office, Gates was reelected in 2018 and 2020.

References

External links
 Biography at Ballotpedia

African-American men in politics
American people of Samoan descent
Living people
Hawaii Greens
Democratic Party members of the Hawaii House of Representatives
Year of birth missing (living people)
21st-century American politicians
21st-century African-American politicians
Leeward Community College alumni